The 1925–26 Divizia A was the fourteenth season of Divizia A, the top-level football league of Romania.

Participating teams

Final Tournament of Regions

Preliminary Games

Quarters

Semifinals

Final
August 1, 1926, Arad

Champion squad

References

Liga I seasons
Romania
1925–26 in Romanian football